Ecgfrith was the name of several Anglo-Saxon kings in England, including:

 Ecgfrith of Northumbria, died 685
 Ecgfrith of Mercia, died 796